Pamela Burgy Minzner (1943-2007) was the New Mexico Supreme Court’s first female chief justice.

Born on November 19, 1943, she earned her bachelor's degree from the University of Miami (1965) and Juris Doctor (1968) at Harvard Law School. Upon graduation from law school, Minzner initially worked as an attorney in Boston, Massachusetts. She was married to Richard C. Minzner, Esq., and after relocating to New Mexico in 1971, they both briefly worked together at the same law firm. A year later, she joined the University of New Mexico School of Law faculty and remained as an educator until 1984. Governor Toney Anaya appointed Minzner to the New Mexico Court of Appeals in 1984. She stayed at the Court of Appeals for ten years, serving as the court's first female Chief Judge from 1993-1994.

On December 2, 1994, Minzner was appointed as a justice of the New Mexico Supreme Court. By 1999, her cohorts elected her as the chief justice of the New Mexico Supreme Court. Minzner made judicial history once again, as she was the first female to serve in the position. She served on the bench until her death on August 31, 2007.

See also 

 New Mexico Supreme Court
 List of justices of the New Mexico Supreme Court
 List of first women lawyers and judges in New Mexico

References 

Justices of the New Mexico Supreme Court
University of Miami alumni
Harvard Law School alumni
University of New Mexico faculty
1943 births
2007 deaths
Deaths from cancer in New Mexico
20th-century American judges
20th-century American women judges
American women academics
21st-century American women
21st-century American women judges
21st-century American judges
Women chief justices of state supreme courts in the United States